Saint Oliver of Ancona - also known as Oliver of Portonuovo, Oliverius or Liberius (died c. 1050), is a saint of the Catholic and Orthodox Christian churches. His feast day is 3 February.

He was a Benedictine monk from Santa Maria di Portonuovo, a community at the foot of Monte Conero, south of Ancona on the Italian Adriatic coast.

It is thought that he came from Armenia, or that he originally was a Camaldolese monk from Dalmatia. Otherwise, basically nothing is known about him.

Another saint with the name Oliver is Oliver Plunkett, an Irish monk of the 17th century.

References

External links
Page with photo of the church Santa Maria di Portonuovo (from the era of St. Oliver)

1050 deaths
Medieval Italian saints
11th-century Christian saints
Year of birth unknown
Year of death uncertain